Minkowski geometry may refer to:

 The geometry of a finite-dimensional normed space
 The  geometry of Minkowski space